The PSM–Nationalist Agreement (PSM–EN) is a democratic socialist, environmentalist and Catalan nationalist political party of the Balearic Isles, Spain. The PSM–EN is a federated party consisting of five constituent parties.

Composition

External links
 Official webpage

References

Political parties in the Balearic Islands
Political parties in Ibiza
Political parties established in 1976
Socialist parties in Spain

br:Partit Socialista de Mallorca Entesa Nacionalista
ca:Partit Socialista de Mallorca
la:PSM-EN